The long-headed hill rat (Bunomys prolatus) is a species of rodent in the family Muridae.
It is found only in Sulawesi, Indonesia, where it is only known from Mount Tambusisi.
Its natural habitat is subtropical or tropical dry forests.
It is threatened by habitat loss.

References

 Baillie, J. 1996.  Bunomys prolatus.   2006 IUCN Red List of Threatened Species.   Downloaded on 19 July 2007.

Bunomys
Rats of Asia
Endemic fauna of Indonesia
Rodents of Sulawesi
Endangered fauna of Asia
Mammals described in 1991
Taxonomy articles created by Polbot